Jack Schroeder (August 21, 1925 – December 19, 2017) was an American politician in the state of Iowa.

Schroeder was born in Davenport, Iowa. He attended law school at Drake University and was a lawyer. He was also a former Chairman of the board of directors and chief executive officer of General Life of Iowa Investment Company and General Life of Iowa Insurance Company. He is also a veteran of the U.S. Navy Air Forces. Schroeder served in the Iowa House from 1951 to 1955 for district 43, and in the State Senate from 1955 to 1967. In the Senate, he represented District 21 from 1955 to 1963, and District 17 from 1963 to 1967. In the 58th Iowa General Assembly, he was majority leader of the Senate.

References

1925 births
2017 deaths
People from Davenport, Iowa
Businesspeople from Iowa
Iowa lawyers
Republican Party Iowa state senators
Republican Party members of the Iowa House of Representatives
20th-century American businesspeople
20th-century American lawyers